Located in the legendary outdoor venue in the mountain town of Telluride, Colorado, the 42nd Telluride Jazz Festival, August 3–5, 2018, celebrates the cultural tradition, modern styles and cutting edge progression of the American Jazz art form delivering an aesthetic experience. Event organizers SBG Productions bring a new era to the Telluride Jazz Festival, showcasing three days and nights of jazz, funk, soul, folk and gospel, with a goal of community engagement and student education. A musically charged local culture accompanied by a wide variety of special events including interactive artist performances, children's activities, late night club shows, on-site camping, outdoor recreation, jazz art walk, historical walking tours, and much more will round out the weekend celebration. The historical mining town of Telluride sits nestled in a scenic box canyon at 8,750 feet, surrounded by 13,000 foot peaks, in the heart of the Rocky Mountains.

Acts
Over the course of more than 30 years, notable performers have included Muddy Waters, Dizzy Gillespie, Glenn Miller Orchestra, Chick Corea, Etta James, Herbie Hancock, Spyro Gyra, John Scofield, John Medeski, Ozomatli, Karl Denson, Jimmy Herring, Bill Frisell Trio, The Greyboy Allstars, Charlie Hunter, Doug Lawrence (jazz) and many more.

See also
Telluride, Colorado

External links
Official web site

Jazz festivals in the United States